William Clement Hlanya Shaba (known as "Clement Shaba", 1926 – September 2008) was a former Anglican Bishop of Central Zambia.
Born in 1926, he trained for the Priesthood at St John's Seminary, Lusaka and was ordained in 1965. After service as a priest in Northern Zambia he was appointed Dean of Mufulira Cathedral. He died in September 2008.

While Shaba was generally called "Clement Shaba", he may have held the legal surname "Hlanya Shaba" or "Hlanya-Shaba".

References

1926 births
Anglican deans in Africa
Anglican bishops of Central Zambia
20th-century Anglican bishops in Africa
2008 deaths